San José de Ocoa is a province in the southern region of the Dominican Republic, and also the name of the province's capital city. It was split from Peravia on January 1, 2000. Published statistics and maps generally include this province in the old, larger, Peravia.

Municipalities and municipal districts
The province as of June 20, 2006 is divided into the following municipalities (municipios) and municipal districts (distrito municipal - D.M.) within them:
Rancho Arriba
Sabana Larga
San José de Ocoa
El Pinar (D.M.)
La Ciénaga (D.M.)
Nizao-Las Auyamas (D.M.)

The following is a sortable table of the municipalities and municipal districts with population figures as of the 2012 census. Urban population are those living in the seats (cabeceras literally heads) of municipalities or of municipal districts. Rural population are those living in the districts (Secciones literally sections) and neighborhoods (Parajes literally places) outside of them.

For comparison with the municipalities and municipal districts of other provinces see the list of municipalities and municipal districts of the Dominican Republic.

References

External links
  Oficina Nacional de Estadística, Statistics Portal of the Dominican Republic
  Oficina Nacional de Estadística, Maps with administrative division of the provinces of the Dominican Republic, downloadable in PDF format

 
Provinces of the Dominican Republic
States and territories established in 2000